Local elections were held at Marikina on May 13, 2019, as part of the Philippine general election. Held concurrently with the national elections, the electorate voted to elect a mayor, a vice mayor, sixteen city council members and two district representatives to congress. Those elected took their respective offices on June 30, 2019, for a three-year-long term.

Marcelino Teodoro and Marion Andres were elected to the mayoralty and vice mayoralty respectively, with the Teodoro being re-elected to his second term and Andres being elected back to the office for a fourth nonconsecutive term. Team MarCy, a coalition between the Nationalist People's Coalition and PDP-Laban won an outright majority in the city council, winning ten seats in the council.  

Bayani Fernando and Stella Quimbo were elected to represent the first and second districts in the 18th Congress, with the former being re-elected for his second term and the latter being elected for her first. Both representatives joined the minority bloc.

Background 

In the 2016 Elections, Marcelino Teodoro was elected to the mayoralty, defeating then-incumbent mayor Del de Guzman who was first elected in 2010. On the other hand, Jose Fabian Cadiz, De Guzman's vice mayor was re-elected to a third term, defeating former mayor Marion Andres. 

Teodoro is running for re-election for a second term with Marion Andres once again being his running mate. Incumbent councilor Eva Aguirre-Paz and Vic Tambuli Sambinano are also running for the vice mayoralty, with the latter substituting for Arnolfo Almocera who later opted to run for a seat in the City Council instead.

Lorderito Nebres and Richard Estanislao of PDP-Laban ran for the mayoralty and vice mayoralty respectively, but both withdrew their respective candidacies in February.

Electoral system 
Local elections are held every three years following 1992, on the second Monday of May coinciding with the elections for the national positions. An individual may only be elected to an office for a maximum of three consecutive terms.

Mayoral election 
The incumbent mayor is Marcelino Teodoro, who was elected in 2016 with 50.17% of the vote. 

Teodoro was left unopposed when Lorderito Nebres of PDP–Laban withdrew his candidacy in February, leaving Teodoro running unopposed.

Candidates 

 Marcelino Teodoro (NPC), incumbent mayor of Marikina, former representative from the 1st district.

Withdrew 

 Lorderito Nebres (PDP-Laban)

Results

Vice mayoral election 
The incumbent vice mayor is Jose Fabian Cadiz, who was re-elected in 2016 with 54.76% of the vote. Cadiz is term-limited and had briefly sought congressional seat for the First District before eventually withdrawing. 

Former Vice Mayor Marion Andres ran as Teodoro's running mate. Andres had previously ran for the post in the last election, being defeated by Cadiz. Incumbent Councilor Eva Aguirre-Paz ran a standalone campaign; while Team ViCe slated Vic Tambuli as their vice mayoral candidate following the withdrawal of Arnolfo Almocera, who would later run for councilor. Richard Estanislao of PDP–Laban withdrew his candidacy in February.

Candidates 

 Marion Andres (NPC), former vice mayor of Marikina, and former councilor from the 1st District.
 Eva Aguirre-Paz (Independent), incumbent councilor from the 1st District.
 Vic Tambuli Sambinano (PDDS), former councilor from the 1st District.

Withdrew 

 Richard Estanislao (PDP–Laban)

Results

House of Representatives elections

Held concurrently with the local elections, two representatives from the city's congressional districts were elected to represent their respective districts in the House of Representatives. In the 2016 elections, Bayani Fernando and Miro Quimbo were elected to represent the first and second districts respectively. Fernando is in the majority bloc of the chamber while Quimbo is in the independent minority.

First district

The incumbent representative is Bayani Fernando, who was elected in 2016 with 54.21% of the vote.

Outgoing vice mayor Jose Fabian Cadiz ran a brief campaign for the seat but later opted to withdraw from the race. His name ultimately remained in the ballot come election day.

Candidates 

 Bayani Fernando (NPC) incumbent representative and former mayor of Marikina.

Withdrew 

 Jose Fabian Cadiz (Liberal), incumbent vice mayor of Marikina.

Results

Second district 

The incumbent representative is Miro Quimbo, who was re-elected in 2016 with 84.68% of the vote. Quimbo is term-limited and is ineligible to run for re-election.

The Liberal Party slated Miro's wife, Stella, to run in his place. Stella faced a challenge from Eugene de Vera, a former representative for ABS Partylist running as an independent, and independent Mauro Arce.

Candidates 

 Mauro Arce (Independent)
 Eugene de Vera (Independent), former representative for ABS Partylist
 Stella Quimbo (Liberal), former commissioner of the Philippine Competition Commission and wife of Miro Quimbo

Results

City Council elections

Tickets
As the mayor, vice mayor and the members of the city council are elected on the same ballot, mayoral candidates may present or endorse a slate of city council candidates. These slates usually run with their respective mayoral and vice mayoral candidates along with the other members of their slate. A group of candidates independent of any mayoral or vice mayoral candidate may also form a slate consisting of themselves.

Team MarCy

Apat na Tapat

Team VICe

Results

First district

|-bgcolor=black
|colspan=5|

Second district

|-bgcolor=black
|colspan=5|

Aftermath 
Eugene de Vera filed a quo warranto petition against Stella Quimbo, who was elected as the representative for the second district. De Vera claimed that Quimbo was ineligible for the position, citing Section 8 of Republic Act No. 10667 or the Philippine Competition Act, which prohibited former commissioners of the Philippine Competition Commission to run for public office during their tenure and the two-year period following their exit from the office. De Vera also claimed that Quimbo did not disclose her former commissionership by stating that she was a teacher in her certificate of candidacy. Beng Sardillo, Quimbo's legal counsel, had derided as de Vera's interpretation of the act as "patently self-serving, erroneous, and has no legal basis".

References

2019 Philippine local elections
Elections in Marikina
Politics of Marikina
May 2019 events in the Philippines
2019 elections in Metro Manila